Taulia may refer to: 

 Taulia Tagovailoa (quarterback), American football quarterback
 Taulia an American company